Dipierro, Di Pierro, di Pierro, or DiPierro is an Italian surname. Notable people with this surname include:

Gaetano Di Pierro (born 1948), Italian bishop
Luca Dipierro, Italian animator and illustrator
Nahuel di Pierro (born 1984), Argentine opera singer
Ray DiPierro (1926–2014), American football player
Serena Dipierro, Italian mathematician

Italian-language surnames